Wilbert Labeaux (August 21, 1914 – July 20, 1990) was an American Negro league second baseman in the 1930s.

A native of New Iberia, Louisiana, Labeaux played for the Chicago American Giants in 1936. In six recorded games, he posted three hits in 23 plate appearances. Labeaux died in Los Angeles, California in 1990 at age 75.

References

External links
Baseball statistics and player information from  Baseball-Reference Black Baseball Stats and Seamheads

1914 births
1990 deaths
Chicago American Giants players
Baseball second basemen
Baseball players from Louisiana
People from New Iberia, Louisiana
20th-century African-American sportspeople